Padmawati Devi (17 July 1918 – 12 April 1987) was an Indian politician. She was elected to the Lok Sabha, the lower house of the Parliament of India from Rajnandgaon, Madhya Pradesh as a member of the Indian National Congress.

Devi died in Bhopal on 12 April 1987, at the age of 68.

References

External links
 Official biographical sketch in Parliament of India website

1918 births
1987 deaths
India MPs 1967–1970
Indian National Congress politicians
Lok Sabha members from Madhya Pradesh